Amu was the nineteenth and last pharaoh of the Hyksos Sixteenth Dynasty of Egypt.
preceded by Yoam

See also
 List of pharaohs

References

Year of birth missing
Year of death missing
16th-century BC Pharaohs
Pharaohs of the Sixteenth Dynasty of Egypt